Alexandrovka is a rural locality (a selo) in Buzovyazovsky Selsoviet, Karmaskalinsky District, Bashkortostan, Russia. The population was 174 as of 2010.

Geography 
It is located 20 km from Karmaskaly and 6 km from Buzovyazy.

References 

Rural localities in Karmaskalinsky District